The Swift Valley Nature Reserve is a nature reserve at the Brownsover area of Rugby, Warwickshire on the northern outskirts of the town.

History
The reserve was created in 2003 by Rugby Borough Council in partnership with the Warwickshire Wildlife Trust, on land acquired as part of a planning agreement with a nearby commercial development. It was opened by David Bellamy in August 2003.

Features
The reserve includes an area of grassland with ancient ridge and furrow, hedgerows, woodland and wetland adjacent to River Swift and a disused canal. A number of paths run around it to allow access.

Old canal arm
A centrepiece of the reserve is a disused arm of the Oxford Canal known as the 'Brownsover Arm'; this was part of the original route of the canal built in the late 18th century. In the 1830s the canal was straightened out and this section of the old route was abandoned. It is no longer navigable, but remains filled with water as it is used to feed water to the Oxford Canal from the River Swift.

Wildlife
The wetland habitats of the reserve contain many species of dragonfly and damselfly. Nationally rare soldier and longhorn beetles have been recorded. Many species of butterflies are also plentiful in the grassland.

Birds on the reserve include kestrel, hobby and sparrowhawks, which can regularly be seen hunting. The wetland area sees a number of species of swans and ducks. Snipe and various gulls visit in the winter.

See also
 Newbold Quarry Park - another nature reserve nearby

References

Nature reserves in Warwickshire
Warwickshire Wildlife Trust
Rugby, Warwickshire
Oxford Canal
2003 establishments in England